Adam Mickiewicz Monument may refer to:
 Adam Mickiewicz Monument, Gorzów Wielkopolski
 Adam Mickiewicz Monument, Kraków
 Adam Mickiewicz Monument, Poznań
 Adam Mickiewicz Monument, Warsaw
 Adam Mickiewicz Monument, Lviv, Ukraine/Poland
 Adam Mickiewicz Monument, Vilnius, Lithuania
 Adam Mickiewicz Monument, Paris, France
 Adam Mickiewicz Monument, Ivano-Frankivsk/Stanislawow, Ukraine/Poland
 Adam Mickiewicz Monument, Minsk, Belarus